Franz Anton Christoph Hilverding (1710–1768), aka Hilferding, was an Austrian choreographer and dancer.  

For a time Hilverding served as the director of the Imperial Theatre in St. Petersburg, Russia. Hilverding, simultaneously as his contemporaries Jean Baptiste de Hesse, and own assistant Gaspare Angiolini, contributed to the development of the Ballet d'Action,  for which Jean Georges Noverre would get lasting credit with the publication of his Letters on Dancing and Ballets.   Ballets d'action emphasized a cohesive dramatic and expressive element to performances, with costumes, plot, and movement all serving the purpose of the story.  

Hilverding studied in Paris from 1734 and 1736, and may have been inspired by the ballerina Marie Sallé, who was one of the first to explore this notion of cohesive dramatic ballets. He started creating dramatic ballets as court choreographer in Vienna in the 1740s, many using the stories of mythological lovers.  Hilverding reworked Rameau's Le Turc Généreux (1758) from Lés Indes Galantes,  which is immortalized in a print by Bernardo Bellotto entitled Le Turc Généreux. Ballet Pantomime executé à Vienne sur le théâtre de la cour, le 26 Avril 1758, in the British Museum.  

Invited by Czarina Elizabeth in 1758, he became court choreographer in St Petersburg.  He brought his dancers with him to Russia, and did much to progress the talent of the Russian dancers.  He tried to use Russian themes in his ballets, and depicted Russia as the "Defender of Virtue" in his "Virtue's Refuge."  Hilverding returned to Vienna in 1764 and staged "Le Triomphe de l'Amour" which starred Marie Antoinette and her brothers Ferdinand and Archduke Maximilian Francis of Austria.

Sources 
 Christopher Duggan. The Force of Destiny: A History of Italy Since 1796. (Boston: Houghton Mifflin Company, 2008) p. 5.
Au, Susan.  "Ballet and Modern Dance".  London:  Thames & Hudson Ltd, 1988, 2002.

18th-century Austrian people
Austrian male ballet dancers
Austrian choreographers
Austrian expatriates in Russia
Dancers from Vienna
1710 births
1768 deaths
18th-century Austrian ballet dancers